Clifford is the title character, and the main protagonist of the Clifford the Big Red Dog book series, written by Norman Bridwell and originally published in 1963, and the television series of the same name. Clifford the Big Red Dog is based on the book series and ran on PBS Kids during the early 2000s. He is the official mascot of Scholastic Corporation.

Concept and creation
Clifford is based on and inspired by Norman Bridwell's childhood desire for a dog the size of a horse. In 1962, Bridwell included paintings of Clifford, then named 'Tiny,' in a portfolio of children's book illustrations. In the process of showing this portfolio to publishing houses, Susan Hirschman at Harper & Row suggested to Bridwell that he turn his drawings into a story for children. Bridwell then developed a story around the dog and his owner, which he would eventually submit to Scholastic. His wife, Norma, suggested he name the dog "Clifford" after her imaginary friend from her childhood. Emily Elizabeth is named after Bridwell's daughter of the same name. Scholastic published the story the following year, in 1963.

Origins
Clifford is a giant, friendly red dog who is owned by a young girl named Emily Elizabeth, with whom he lives in New York City. The debut book is narrated by his owner, and details Clifford's versatility, helpfulness, and friendships. As the books progress, they detail his many experiences with Emily Elizabeth and her adventures (such as gaining temporary celebrity status in one book). The books also portray the endless benefits presented by Clifford's unusual size and gentleness or the occasional disadvantages at some points. Clifford's infancy is occasionally mentioned and depicted in a few books, in which he appears as a regular-sized, small puppy; albeit it has been mentioned that he later grew to tremendous proportions.

Although Clifford is depicted as a regular-sized dog aside from his size in the series of picture books, in the animated series adapted from the books, he and his adoptive family live in the fictional island country Birdwell Island, and he is gifted with extra anthropomorphism and the ability to speak when conversing with other dogs. Several other characters were introduced only in the animated series, particularly Clifford's canine companions and their owners, most notably his two best friends; a flamboyant, stylish lavender purple poodle named Cleo (voiced by Cree Summer) and pudgy yellow Bull Terrier named T-Bone (voiced by Kel Mitchell) other characters include a prideful sky blue Greyhound named Mac and a three-legged beagle named K.C. (both voiced by Cam Clarke) as opposed to detailing Clifford's experiences with humans or describing his escapades from a human's viewpoint, the episodes of the television program further explore Clifford's viewpoint (as well as those of his canine acquaintances) and educational morals learned through their experiences, with the help of the capabilities presented by their ability to speak and hold conversations together.

After this series ended its run, a new series was spun off, entitled Clifford's Puppy Days, chronicling Clifford's youth as a tiny puppy before his family's relocation to Birdwell Island, the setting of the original animated program. Here, new characters are presented that appeared neither in the original storybooks nor the other series, such as Emily Elizabeth's neighbors and local animals and pets acquainted with Clifford during his babyhood. Such characters include Jorge (voiced by Jess Harnell), a Spanish dachshund owned by Emily's friend Nina (voiced by Masiela Lusha), Daffodil (voiced by Kath Soucie), a pink pet rabbit owned by Emily, Norville (voiced by Henry Winkler), a bird, among others.

In the animated reboot, Clifford is portrayed as a playful and helpful dog who can talk to Emily Elizabeth, similar to the home video series in 1988 and unlike the original television series and joins her to embark on adventures and explore their home island. The reboot also introduced several new characters, including Clifford's new canine friends; Bailey, an Australian Shepherd (voiced by Bahia Watson) owned by one of Emily's new friends Samantha Mulberry (voiced by Jenna Weir), Tucker, a Dalmatian puppy (voiced by Julie Lemieux) owned by Fire Chief Franklin (voiced by John Cleland), Hero, a beagle (voiced by Matt Folliott) owned by Pablo Flores (voiced by Niko Ceci), and Hudson, a Yorkshire Terrier (voiced by Markeda McKay) owned by Fisherman Charlie (voiced by Sugith Varughese).

In the live-action film, Clifford is portrayed as a small red puppy who lost his family to the dogcatchers, leaving him an orphan, and then becomes a 10-foot-tall red dog. Unlike both the animated series and the animated film, he barks and can outsmart numerous New York City Police Department officers, CIA agents, and the animal control officers in New York City.

References

Clifford the Big Red Dog
Literary characters introduced in 1963
Mascots introduced in 1963
Fictional dogs
Fictional giants
Fictional characters who can change size
Characters in children's literature
Fictional characters from New York City
Dog mascots
Male characters in animation
Male characters in film